Intercourse may refer to:

 Sexual intercourse, the most common penetrative sex in humans
 Interpersonal communication, talk, any kind of human communication and/or interaction

Places
 Intercourse, Alabama, US
 Intercourse, Pennsylvania, US
 Intercourse Island, in Western Australia

Arts and media

Books
 Intercourse (book), the title of a 1987 book by author Andrea Dworkin
 InterCourses: An Aphrodisiac Cookbook, a 1997 book by Martha Hopkins and Randall Lockridge with photography by Ben Fink

Music
 Intercourse (The Tokens album), a 1971 album by American vocal group the Tokens
 Intercourse (S'Express album), a 1991 studio album by English dance music act S'Express
 "Intercourse", a 2020 song by Megan Thee Stallion featuring Popcaan and Mustard from Good News

Other arts and media
 The Intercourse (arts center), an arts center in Red Hook, Brooklyn, New York
 Intercourse (magazine), a literary magazine published in Montreal from 1966 to 1971

See also
 Non-Intercourse Act (1809), regarding trade
 Nonintercourse Act, a collective name given to six statutes to set Amerindian boundaries of reservations, instituted between 1790 and 1834